David "Dai" Maidment (birth unknown – death unknown) was a Welsh professional rugby league footballer who played in the 1920s.

International honours
Dai Maidment won a cap for Wales while at Wakefield Trinity in the 15–39 defeat by England at White City Stadium, Sloper Road, Grangetown, Cardiff on Wednesday 14 November 1928.

References

Place of birth missing
Place of death missing
Rugby league locks
Wakefield Trinity players
Wales national rugby league team players
Welsh rugby league players
Year of birth missing
Year of death missing